Moški rokometni klub Krka, commonly referred to as MRK Krka or simply Krka, is a handball club from Novo Mesto, Slovenia. As of the 2022–23 season, Krka competes in the Slovenian First League.

Honours
Slovenian Handball Cup
Runners-up: 2017–18, 2018–19

Slovenian Supercup
Winners: 2018

References

External links
Official website 

Slovenian handball clubs
Sport in Novo Mesto
2000 establishments in Slovenia
Handball clubs established in 2000